Foeniculum  is a genus of flowering plants  in the carrot family. It includes the commonly cultivated fennel, Foeniculum vulgare.

Species
Foeniculum scoparium Quézel - North Africa 
Foeniculum subinodorum Maire, Weiller & Wilczek - North Africa
Foeniculum vulgare Mill. - Mediterranean, cultivated and naturalized in many regions

References

Apioideae
Taxa named by Philip Miller
Apioideae genera